Helix was a short-lived science fiction and science fantasy imprint of DC Comics, launched in 1996 and discontinued in 1998. In early promotional materials prior to the release of the first title, the imprint was called Matrix instead of Helix. It was renamed because of the then-upcoming film, The Matrix. It featured a handful of ongoing monthly series, several limited series, and one short graphic novel.

Despite the involvement of successful science fiction/fantasy novelists Michael Moorcock, Lucius Shepard and Christopher Hinz, and established comics creators Howard Chaykin, Elaine Lee, Matt Howarth, Warren Ellis, Walt Simonson, and Garth Ennis, sales of the comic books were low, and most of the ongoing titles were cancelled after 12 or fewer issues. Ellis' Transmetropolitan was switched to the Vertigo imprint, where it continued for several more years before reaching its planned conclusion. Ennis' Bloody Mary miniseries and Michael Moorcock's Multiverse were later collected in Vertigo-label paperbacks and Moeller's Sheva's War was released as a graphic novel paperback by Dark Horse.

Limited availability of the books in bookstores that already sold science fiction, resistance among science-fiction readers to serialized monthly publication, the lower visibility of the line's deliberately muted cover color palette, and the lack of interest in genre SF among regular patrons of comic-book stores were all cited by industry observers as factors in the imprint's demise.

Helix titles

Notes

References

DC Comics imprints
Defunct comics and manga publishing companies
Helix (comics) titles
Science fiction comics